Antonio Alejandro Porta Pernigotti (born 28 October 1983) is a former Argentine-Italian professional basketball player, who lasted played with the Svendborg Rabbits in the Danish Basketball League. He played at both the point guard and shooting guard positions. Porta is now a basketball coach on the “Svendborg Efterskole” in Svendborg, Denmark. He is the coach of a group of young teenagers.

Professional career
Porta played with several clubs in the Italian League, and also in the Spanish League and the Russian Super League.

National team career
Porta was a member of the senior Argentine national basketball team. He made his debut with the national team at the 2005 Stanković Continental Champions' Cup. He also played with Argentina at the 2005 FIBA Americas Championship, the 2006 South American Championship, and the 2007 FIBA Americas Championship. He was also a part of the Argentina squad that won a bronze medal at the 2008 Summer Olympic Games.

References

External links
Eurobasket.com Profile
Italian League Profile 
Spanish League Profile 
FIBA.com Profile (archive)

1983 births
Living people
Argentine expatriate basketball people in Spain
Argentine men's basketball players
Argentine people of Italian descent
Andrea Costa Imola players
Basket Livorno players
Basketball players at the 2008 Summer Olympics
BC Spartak Saint Petersburg players
CB Valladolid players
Italian expatriate basketball people in Spain
Italian men's basketball players
Lega Basket Serie A players
Liga ACB players
Medalists at the 2008 Summer Olympics
Olympic basketball players of Argentina
Olympic bronze medalists for Argentina
Olympic medalists in basketball
Pallacanestro Biella players
People from General López Department
Point guards
S.S. Felice Scandone players
Scafati Basket players
Scaligera Basket Verona players
Shooting guards
Sportspeople from Santa Fe Province
Svendborg Rabbits players